AC/DC are an Australian hard rock band.

AC/DC or AC-DC can refer to any device that runs on alternating current (AC) and/or direct current (DC), two types of mains power. 

AC/DC may also refer to:

Electronics
 AC/DC converter, or rectifier, a device that converts AC to DC
 AC/DC motor, a type of electric motor that runs on AC or DC
 AC/DC receiver, broadcast receivers from the early days of radio and television that ran from AC or DC mains
 AC/DC supply, power supply
 The historical commercial Battle of Currents between distributors of AC or DC as mains power
 Power inverter, a device that converts DC to AC

Music
 AC/DC (video), by the band, 1989
 ACxDC, American hardcore punk band
 ACDC, a dance crew led by Adam G. Sevani and Jon M. Chu

Other uses
 AC/DC (pinball), a pinball machine designed after the band AC/DC
 "AC/DC" (Brooklyn Nine-Nine), a television episode
 AC/DC (slang), a slang term for bisexuality
 AC/DC, short for Add to Commons / Descriptive Claims,  a Wikimedia Commons JavaScript gadget

See also

 
 
 ACDSee, a shareware image viewer program
 AC/DShe, an all-female AC/DC tribute band from San Francisco
 ACDC (disambiguation)
 AC (disambiguation)
 DC (disambiguation)